Rivera is a town and municipality in the Huila Department, Colombia.

References

 Municipalities of Huila Department